Pyrrolidinophenones are a class of recreational designer drugs including many substituted cathinones. The prototypical example is alpha-pyrrolidinopentiophenone (α-PVP).

Pyrrolidinophenones have psychostimulant effects and are associated with central nervous system and cardiovascular toxicities.

References